Cordovado is a comune (municipality) in the Province of Pordenone in the Italian region Friuli-Venezia Giulia, located about  northwest of Trieste and about  southeast of Pordenone.

Cordovado borders the following municipalities: Gruaro, Morsano al Tagliamento, Sesto al Reghena, Teglio Veneto.

References

External links
 Official website

Cities and towns in Friuli-Venezia Giulia